Two for the Show is  the second album by Canadian rock band Trooper, released in 1976. The album was produced by Randy Bachman of Bachman–Turner Overdrive and The Guess Who fame. The album was certified gold in Canada, contained the hits "Two for the Show" and "Santa Maria". "The Boys in the Bright White Sportscar", initially released off this album, later became a hit when it was re-released (with a few modifications) on Hot Shots in 1979.

Track listing
(McGuire/Smith)

 4:26 - "Two for the Show" (McGuire) 
 3:30 - "Gypsy Wheeler" 
 2:56 - "Santa Maria" 
 3:21 - "Loretta" (Smith/Stewart) 
 3:00 - "The Boys in the Bright White Sportscar" 
 3:26 - "Ready"
 3:28 - "Whatcha Gonna Do About Me"
 4:48 - "I Miss You Already" 
 5:26 - "What's Gonna Happen Now"

Band members

 Vocals - Ra McGuire
 Guitar - Brian Smith 
 Drums - Tommy Stewart
 Bass - Harry Kalensky
 Keyboards - Frank Ludwig

Singles

 "Two For The Show" / "Gypsy Wheeler"
 "Santa Maria" / "Whatcha Gonna Do About Me"
 "Ready" / "I Miss You Already"

References

Trooper (band) albums
1976 albums